The Walapane Polling Division is a Polling Division in the Nuwara Eliya Electoral District, in the Central Province, Sri Lanka.

Presidential Election Results

Summary 

The winner of Walapane has matched the final country result 5 out of 8 times. Hence, Walapane is a Weak Bellwether for Presidential Elections.

2019 Sri Lankan Presidential Election

2015 Sri Lankan Presidential Election

2010 Sri Lankan Presidential Election

2005 Sri Lankan Presidential Election

1999 Sri Lankan Presidential Election

1994 Sri Lankan Presidential Election

1988 Sri Lankan Presidential Election

1982 Sri Lankan Presidential Election

Parliamentary Election Results

Summary 

The winner of Walapane has matched the final country result 5 out of 7 times. Hence, Walapane is a Weak Bellwether for Parliamentary Elections.

2015 Sri Lankan Parliamentary Election

2010 Sri Lankan Parliamentary Election

2004 Sri Lankan Parliamentary Election

2001 Sri Lankan Parliamentary Election

2000 Sri Lankan Parliamentary Election

1994 Sri Lankan Parliamentary Election

1989 Sri Lankan Parliamentary Election

Demographics

Ethnicity 

The Walapane Polling Division has a Sinhalese majority (63.0%) and a significant Indian Tamil population (33.8%) . In comparison, the Nuwara Eliya Electoral District (which contains the Walapane Polling Division) has an Indian Tamil majority (53.1%) and a significant Sinhalese population (39.6%)

Religion 

The Walapane Polling Division has a Buddhist majority (62.7%) and a significant Hindu population (33.1%) . In comparison, the Nuwara Eliya Electoral District (which contains the Walapane Polling Division) has a Hindu majority (51.0%) and a significant Buddhist population (39.1%)

References 

Polling Divisions of Sri Lanka
Polling Divisions of the Nuwara-Eliya Electoral District